Central High School is a historic high school building located near Painter, Accomack County, Virginia. It was built in 1932, with an addition in 1935, and is a two-story, "T"-shaped, brick building with brick and stone detailing in the Art Deco style.  The 1935 addition was funded by the Public Works Administration.  The building served as a high school until 1984, when it was converted to a middle school.  Also on the property are a contributing one-story wood-frame double classroom building, one-story vocational school building, and a one-story Colonial Revival style dwelling that served as the home economics building.

It was added to the National Register of Historic Places in 2011.

References

Public Works Administration in Virginia
School buildings on the National Register of Historic Places in Virginia
Colonial Revival architecture in Virginia
Art Deco architecture in Virginia
School buildings completed in 1935
National Register of Historic Places in Accomack County, Virginia
1935 establishments in Virginia